This is a list of Norwegian television related events from 2004.

Events
14 May - Kjartan Salvesen wins the second series of Idol. His debut single, "Standing Tall" reaches number one in the VG-lista three weeks later.

Debuts

International
January -  Tractor Tom (TV 2)

Television shows

2000s
Idol (2003-2007, 2011–present)

Ending this year

Births

Deaths

See also
2004 in Norway